The Economic Organization of War Communism, 1918—1921, is a history book by Silvana Malle about economics of Soviet Russia during war communism time.

References 
 Rosenberg W. G. Review of The Economic Organization of War Communism, 1918—1921 // The American Historical Review. — 1987. — Vol. 92, iss. 3. — P. 712—713. — DOI:10.2307/1870016.
 Nove A. Review of The Economic Organization of War Communism, 1918—21 // The Economic History Review. — 1987. — Vol. 40, iss. 3. — P. 483—484. — DOI:10.2307/2596279.
 Remington T. F. Review of The Economic Organization of War Communism, 1918—1921 // Soviet Studies. — 1987. — Vol. 39, iss. 1. — P. 138—139. — DOI:10.2307/151443.
 Gregory P. R. Review of The Economic Organization of War Communism 1918—1921 // Russian History. — 1989. — Vol. 16, iss. 1. — P. 95—96. — DOI:10.2307/24657681.
 Lincoln W. B. Review of The Economic Organization of War Communism, 1918—1921 // Canadian Slavonic Papers. — 1987. — Vol. 29, iss. 2/3. — P. 306—307. — DOI:10.2307/40868766.
 Husband W. B. Review of The Economic Organization of War Communism, 1918—1921 // Slavic Review. — 1987. — Vol. 46, iss. 1. — P. 158. — DOI:10.2307/2498651.
 Lih L. T. Review of The Economic Organization of War Communism 1918—1921 // The Russian Review. — 1987. — Vol. 46, iss. 4. — P. 455—456. — DOI:10.2307/130310.
 Burkett J. P. Review of The Economic Organization of War Communism, 1918—1921 // Journal of Economic Literature. — 1987. — Vol. 25, iss. 4. — P. 1861—1863. — DOI:10.2307/2726455.

1985 non-fiction books
American history books
English-language books
History books about Russia
Cambridge University Press books